Wickes is a city in Polk County, Arkansas, United States. The population was 754 at the 2010 census.

Near Wickes is the Boggs Springs Youth Encampment of the American Baptist Association, a retreat of Missionary Baptist churches.

Wickes has historic places such as the 100-year-old City Hall, and the Lighthouse Drive-in.

Geography
Wickes is located at  (34.301291, -94.334908).

According to the United States Census Bureau, the town has a total area of 6.0 km (2.3 mi2), of which 6.0 km (2.3 mi2) is land and 0.43% is water.

Wickes is home of the western terminus of U.S. Route 278.

Demographics

2020 census

As of the 2020 United States census, there were 637 people, 302 households, and 250 families residing in the town.

2010 census
As of the 2010 census Wickes had a population of 754.  The ethnic and racial composition of the population was 52.1% Hispanic or Latino, 44.3% non-Hispanic white, 0.4% African-American, 2.1% Native American and 2.4% reporting two or more races.

2000 census
As of the census of 2000, there were 675 people, 222 households, and 174 families residing in the town.  The population density was 112.3/km (290.6/mi2).  There were 256 housing units at an average density of 42.6/km (110.2/mi2).  The racial makeup of the town was 73.78% White, 3.26% Native American, 19.70% from other races, and 3.26% from two or more races.  31.70% of the population were Hispanic or Latino of any race.

There were 222 households, out of which 48.6% had children under the age of 18 living with them, 57.7% were married couples living together, 13.5% had a female householder with no husband present, and 21.6% were non-families. 19.8% of all households were made up of individuals, and 8.1% had someone living alone who was 65 years of age or older.  The average household size was 3.04 and the average family size was 3.48.

In the town, the population was spread out, with 37.5% under the age of 18, 10.7% from 18 to 24, 29.5% from 25 to 44, 14.8% from 45 to 64, and 7.6% who were 65 years of age or older.  The median age was 26 years. For every 100 females, there were 100.9 males.  For every 100 females age 18 and over, there were 100.0 males.

The median income for a household in the town was $20,515, and the median income for a family was $22,292. Males had a median income of $19,659 versus $17,045 for females. The per capita income for the town was $7,572.  About 27.6% of families and 37.1% of the population were below the poverty line, including 45.4% of those under age 18 and 10.6% of those age 65 or over.

Education 
Public education is provided for early childhood, elementary and secondary school students from the Cossatot River School District, which includes Wickes Elementary School, and Cossatot River High School. The high school formed in 2013, with the merger of Wickes High School and Van-Cove High School.

It was previously a part of the Wickes School District. On July 1, 2010 that district consolidated with the Van Cove School District into the Cossatot River School District.

References

Cities in Polk County, Arkansas
Cities in Arkansas